The Ebonyi State Executive Council (also known as, the Cabinet of Ebonyi State) is the highest formal governmental body that plays important roles in the Government of Ebonyi State headed by the Governor of Ebonyi State. It consists of the Governor, Deputy Governor, Secretary to the State Government, Chief of Staff, Commissioners who preside over ministerial departments, and the Governor's special aides.

Functions
The Executive Council exists to advise and direct the Governor. Their appointment as members of the Executive Council gives them the authority to execute power over their fields.

Current cabinet
The current Executive Council is serving under the Dave Umahi administration which was elected as the 5th Governor of Ebonyi State on April 11, 2015.

References

Ebonyi
Politics of Ebonyi State